SS John McKinley was a Liberty ship built in the United States during World War II. She was named after John McKinley, an Associate Justice of the Supreme Court of the United States and U.S. Senator from Alabama.

Construction
John McKinley was laid down on 23 March 1943, under a Maritime Commission (MARCOM) contract, MC hull 1495, by J.A. Jones Construction, Brunswick, Georgia; sponsored by Myrtle McCranie Willacoochee, and launched on 31 July 1943.

History
She was allocated to Dichman, Wright, and Pugh, on 20 August 1943. On 19 October 1945, she entered the National Defense Reserve Fleet in Suisun Bay. She was sold to Zidell Exploration, Inc., Portland, Oregon, for $45,101, and delivered for scrapping on 7 February 1967.

References

Bibliography

 
 
 
 
 

 

Liberty ships
Ships built in Brunswick, Georgia
1943 ships
Suisun Bay Reserve Fleet